Mana Hared Abdi is a Somali-American politician who is a member of the Maine House of Representatives representing District 95 in Lewiston after her Republican opponent, Fred Sanborn-Sanders, dropped out of the race.

Abdi is a Lewiston High School (Maine) and University of Maine at Farmington graduate.  She has been working at the Office of Intercultural Education at Bates College.

References

Somalian emigrants to the United States
Lewiston High School (Maine) alumni
University of Maine at Farmington alumni
Bates College people
American politicians of Somalian descent
Year of birth missing (living people)
Living people